Ron Morrison was the head of School of the computer science department of the University of St. Andrews where he worked on programming languages, inventing S-algol, and coinventing PS-algol and Napier88. He had graduated from St. Andrews with a Doctor of Philosophy (Ph.D.) in 1979. He is also heavily involved with local athletics, coaching the University Cross-Country team, and young, up and coming local athletes. He is a Fellow of the Royal Society of Edinburgh, and the current President of Scottish Athletics.

He retired from St. Andrews in January 2008.

Selected publications

Coaching and officiating 
Morrison has coached many athletes, including Andrew Lemoncello and Derek Rae.  He received the Endurance Official of the Year award at British Athletics 16th annual Officials Conference in April 2019.

References

External links 
 , St. Andrews
 Keynes Without Debt
 Scottish Athletics staff page

Year of birth missing (living people)
Living people